This article documents the strengths of political parties in the 333 local authorities of England, 32 local authorities of Scotland, 22 principal councils of Wales and 11 local councils of Northern Ireland.

England's 333 local authorities are made up of: 32 London borough councils, 24 county councils and 181 district councils (two tiers of local government which share responsibility for the same physical area), 36 metropolitan district councils and 58 unitary authorities, plus the sui generis City of London Corporation and Council of the Isles of Scilly.

This article does not cover the Greater London Authority or the 10 combined authorities of England (and their respective mayors). It also doesn't cover the 35 police and crime commissioners or the four police, fire and crime commissioners in England and Wales. And it also doesn't include the thousands of parish/local councils of England, community councils of Scotland and community councils of Wales.

English local authorities have a choice of executive arrangements out of a mayor and cabinet executive, a leader and cabinet executive, a committee system or alternative arrangements approved by the Secretary of State. Councils in England and Northern Ireland run on four year cycles, while councils in Scotland and, from 2022, in Wales run on five year cycles. An English local authority's councillors may be elected all at once, by halves or by thirds. Because of this disparate system, various local elections take place every year, but changes in party representation arise frequently regardless due to resignations, deaths, by-elections, co-options and changes of affiliation.

Summary
Last full update: 22 June 2022

Political control of the Local Government in England 
The table below shows who has political control of each of the 24 non-metropolitan county councils (NMC), the 58 unitary authorities (UA), the 36 metropolitan districts (MD), the 32 London boroughs (LB) as well as the two sui generis entities: the City of London (CL) and the Isles of Scilly (IS). In total, 152 local government councils.

The table differentiates between councils fully controlled by one party and others where a certain party leads a coalition that governs the council. All parties apart from the Conservatives (CON), Labour (LAB) and Liberal Democrats (LDM); as well as independents, are grouped in the category: OTHER.

England: London borough councils 
Last full update: 22 June 2022

England: two-tier county and district councils

County councils 
Last full update: 6 June 2022

District councils
Last full update: 11 June 2022

England: metropolitan district councils
Last full update: 22 June 2022

England: unitary authorities
Last full update: 22 June 2022

England: sui generis councils 
Last full update: 22 June 2022

Scotland
All 32 Scottish Councils had all their seats up for election by Single Transferable Vote in May 2022. Elections are on a five-year cycle and are next due in May 2027. Only two mainland councils are controlled by majority administrations: Dundee and West Dumbartonshire, who are controlled by Scottish Labour and the Scottish National Party, respectively. The three island councils (Orkney, Shetland and the Western Isles) are each controlled by local independents. 

Political control may be held by minority governments (min), coalitions (co), joint leadership arrangements (j.l.) or partnership working arrangements (p.w.).

Last update 6 May 2022.

Wales

All 22 Welsh unitary authorities had all of their seats up for election in May 2022, and the next elections are expected in May 2027.

Last update 9 June 2022.

Northern Ireland
Elections were held for 11 newly created councils in Northern Ireland in May 2014, and May 2019, and on a four-year cycle after that, with the next scheduled to be held in May 2023. All seats are filled at once by Single Transferable vote within district electoral areas of 5 to 7 wards.

The councils have ceremonial mayors elected by council members. Uniquely in the UK, vacancies are filled by co-option by whichever party won the seat at the previous election.

Last update 14 February 2023.

See also 
List of political parties in the United Kingdom by representation
Local government in the United Kingdom
Local government in England
History of local government in England
Local government in Scotland
Local government in Wales
Local government in Northern Ireland

References 

Local government in the United Kingdom
Political parties in the United Kingdom
United Kingdom politics-related lists